Christine Marie Evert (born December 21, 1954), known as Chris Evert Lloyd from 1979 to 1987, is an American former world No. 1 tennis player. Evert won 18 major singles titles, including a record seven French Open titles and a joint-record six US Open titles (tied with Serena Williams). She was ranked world No. 1 for 260 weeks, and was the year-end world No. 1 singles player seven times (1974–78, 1980, 1981). Alongside Martina Navratilova, her greatest rival, Evert dominated women's tennis in the 1970s and 1980s.

Evert reached 34 major singles finals, the most in history. In singles, Evert reached the semifinals or better in 52 of the 56 majors she played, including at 34 consecutive majors entered from the 1971 US Open through the 1983 French Open. She never lost in the first or second round of a major, and lost in the third round only twice. She holds the record of most consecutive years (13) of winning at least one major title. Evert's career winning percentage in singles matches of 89.97% (1309–146) is the second highest in the Open Era, for men or women. On clay courts, her career winning percentage in singles matches of 94.55% (382–22) remains a WTA Tour record. She also won three major doubles titles.

Evert served as president of the Women's Tennis Association for eleven years, 1975–76 and 1983–91. She was awarded the Philippe Chatrier award and inducted into the Hall of Fame. In later life, Evert was a coach and is now an analyst for ESPN, and has a line of tennis and active apparel.

Tennis career

Evert began taking tennis lessons from her father Jimmy Evert when she was five years old. He was a professional tennis coach who had won the men's singles title at the Canadian Championships in 1947. By 1969, she had become the No. 1 ranked under-14 girl in the United States. Evert played her first senior tournament in that year also, reaching the semifinals in her hometown of Fort Lauderdale, Florida, losing to Mary-Ann Eisel in three sets. For years, this was the record for the furthest a player had reached in her first senior-level tournament. That record was broken when another Floridian, Jennifer Capriati, reached the final at Boca Raton in 1990. In 1970, Evert won the national 16-and-under championship and was invited to play in an eight-player clay-court tournament in Charlotte, North Carolina. The 15-year-old Evert defeated Françoise Dürr in the first round in straight sets before defeating Margaret Court 7–6, 7–6 in a semifinal. Court was the world No. 1 player and had just won the Grand Slam in singles. These results led to Evert's selection for the U.S. Wightman Cup team as the youngest player ever in the competition.

Evert made her Grand Slam tournament debut at age 16 at the 1971 US Open; she received an invitation after winning the national 16-and-under championship. After an easy straight-sets win over Edda Buding in the first round, she faced the American No. 4, Mary-Ann Eisel in the second round. With Eisel serving at 6–4, 6–5 (40–0) in the second set – Evert saved six match points before going on to win 4–6, 7–6, 6–1. She made two further comebacks from a set down, against fifth seed Dürr and Lesley Hunt, both seasoned professionals, before losing to top seed Billie Jean King in a semifinal in straight sets. This defeat ended a 46-match winning streak built up through a variety of professional and junior tour events. This winning streak included her first matches with and wins over King, Virginia Wade and Betty Stöve.

In 1973, Evert was the runner-up at the French Open and the Wimbledon Championships. A year later she won both those events during her then-record 55-consecutive-match winning streak, which included eight other tournament wins. She ended the year with a 100–7 match record, winning 16 tournaments including two Grand Slams, having been a finalist in her first Australian Open, and having for a fourth straight year reached the semifinals at the US Open. She was chosen as the year-end number one by the leading tennis experts and authorities of the day – except Bud Collins – over her closest rivals, King and Evonne Goolagong, each of whom had six titles including a Grand Slam (King the US Open and Goolagong the Australian Open).

At the time, she was engaged to Jimmy Connors, who won the Wimbledon men's singles title that year as media attention surrounded the summer "Love Match" of tennis. They partnered in the mixed-doubles event at the 1974 US Open, finishing as runners-up. Their engagement was short-lived as it was called off later that year. However, their on-again-off-again relationship continued over the next couple of years.

For the next five years, Evert was the world's No.1 player. In 1975 she won her second French Open and the first of four straight US Open titles by defeating Cawley in a three-set final. Also in November of that year, the official WTA computer ranking system was instituted, with Evert being the first No. 1. In total, Evert logged 260 weeks at number one. Until February 2013, she held the record of the oldest woman to be ranked WTA number one, achieving that distinction after reclaiming the spot for the final time during the week of November 24, 1985, at the age of 30 years and 11 months. This was ten years and three weeks after she had first achieved the number-one spot. That record stood for 27 years and 3 months until Serena Williams surpassed it in 2013.

Evert's domination of the women's game and her calm, steely demeanor on court earned her the nickname of the "Ice Maiden" of tennis. Throughout her career, Evert was ranked number one in the world at the end of seven different years by Tennis magazine, by World Tennis magazine and as well as a majority of other major tennis experts from 1974 through 1978, and in 1980 and 1981. In addition, Evert had by far the overall best match record in each of those seven years.

The following 1976 season holds a unique distinction for Evert, as this was the only time in her career where she won both Wimbledon and the US Open titles in the same year. She defeated Goolagong Cawley in a thrilling three-set final on grass and then dismantled her on clay at Forest Hills, losing just three games. However, Evert lost to Goolagong Cawley again in the final of the Virginia Slims Championships. In all, Evert won 26 of 39 matches with Cawley. Evert's 1976 performance earned her Sports Illustrated's title of Sportsman of the Year (the first woman to solely be chosen) and one of only four occasions (King, Arthur Ashe and Williams) the award was given to a tennis player.

The years 1977 and 1978 saw Evert continue to dominate the women's game, winning two more US Opens, the final one played at Forest Hills on clay (1977) and the inaugural one on hard courts at Flushing Meadow (1978 - giving her the distinction as the only female player to win the US Open on two different surfaces). She won 18 of 25 tournaments, with a 126–7 match record, failing only once to reach at least the semifinals during that span. Of particular note is that Evert skipped the French Open during these years (as well as 1976) to play in King's World TeamTennis. The other noteworthy event was Evert's three-set loss to eventual champion Wade in the semifinals of the 1977 Wimbledon Championships. It was Wimbledon's centenary year, coinciding with Queen Elizabeth II's Silver Jubilee as monarch.

Though successful on all surfaces, it was on clay courts where Evert was most dominant. Beginning in August 1973, she won 125 consecutive matches on clay, losing only eight sets throughout; a run which continues to stand as the benchmark among both men and women players. The streak was broken on May 12, 1979, in a semifinal of the Italian Open, when Evert lost to Tracy Austin in a third-set tiebreak after Evert lost a game point to go up 5–2 in the final set. Evert said after the match, "Not having the record will take some pressure off me, but I am not glad to have lost it." Evert rebounded with another clay court streak that reached 64 matches (including titles at the 1979 and 1980 French Open) before ending with a semifinal loss to eventual winner Hana Mandlíková at the 1981 French Open (a record of 189 victories in 191 matches on clay from 1973 to 1981). Hilde Krahwinkel had a similar run of clay-court dominance from 1935 through 1939, winning the French Championships in three consecutive years (not playing there the other two years) and incurring only one loss on clay during that five-year period.

Evert's record of seven French Open singles titles stood for 27 years until being broken in June 2013 by Rafael Nadal. She still holds the record for female players. She also held the record for most clay court Grand Slam titles (10 with seven French Opens and all three US Opens played on clay in 1975–77) before Nadal passed her with his 11th title at the 2018 French Open.
Three of her victories came in three-set finals against Navratilova. In 1975, Evert defeated Navratilova 2–6, 6–2, 6–1 to defend her title from the previous year. In 1985, Evert prevailed 6–3, 6–7, 7–5, a win that saw her capture the world No. 1 computer ranking for the fifth and final time.

For Evert, beating Navratilova in any Grand Slam represented beating the best player, which provided her with two of her most satisfying "final time" wins: The 1986 French Open, where at the age of 31 years, she won her last Grand Slam title defeating Navratilova in three sets and the 1988 Australian Open where she handily dispatched Navratilova in the semifinals in two sets to reach her 34th and last Grand Slam final at age 33.

Evert won at least one Grand Slam singles title a year for 13 consecutive years, from 1974 through 1986. During this period, Evert did not participate in the Australian Opens held from 1975 to 1980 and in 1983, or the French Opens from 1976 to 1978. The reasons for Evert's non-participation in the Australian Open during the years of her greatest dominance (she was ranked No.1 in the world five of the six years she was absent from the event between 1975 and 1980) was the relative decline in the status of this Grand Slam tournament during that period, so that the top American and European players tended to stay away. Evert's absence from the French Open in 1976, 1977 and 1978 reflected the allure of World Team Tennis and the generally lesser significance that the top players attached to the traditional Slam events in the early years of the professional era. During this period of dominance (1975–80), she skipped ten Grand Slam tournaments.

Between September 1971 (her Grand Slam debut at the US Open) and June 1983 (her 12th visit to the Wimbledon Championships), Evert never failed to reach at least the semi-finals of the 34 Grand Slam singles events she entered. This string, however, was broken in the third round at Wimbledon in 1983 when the All England Club refused Evert's request to delay her match with Kathy Jordan to recover from food poisoning. This defeat also ended her attempt to be the holder of all four Grand Slam singles titles simultaneously, as Evert was then holder of the '82 Australian, U.S., and the '83 French titles. In 56 Grand Slam singles events entered from 1971 to 1989, Evert fell short of the semifinals a mere four times (1983 Wimbledon 3rd round; 1987 US Open quarterfinal; 1988 French Open 3rd round; 1989 US Open quarterfinal).

In total, of the record 34 Grand Slam finals reached, Evert won 18 Grand Slam singles titles: seven at the French Open (record for female), six at the US Open (an open era record, male or female, tied with Serena Williams), three at Wimbledon, and two at the Australian Open (both on grass). In addition, Evert won three Grand Slam doubles titles, at the French in 1974 with Olga Morozova, there in 1975 with Navratilova, and again with Navratilova at Wimbledon in 1976.

Evert's overall record in Grand Slam events was 297–38 (88.7%): 72–6 at the French Open, 94–15 at Wimbledon, 101–13 at the US Open (the record for most singles match wins in history, male or female), and 30–4 at the Australian Open (never failing to reach the final and she is the only female player to have played the final on grass and hard courts).

Regarding their Slam rivalry, Evert faced Navratilova in the final of 14 Grand Slam events, with a 4–10 record. Navratilova defeated Evert at least once in the final of each of the four Grand Slam events: the Australian Open (1981, 1985), the French Open (1984), Wimbledon (1978, 1979, 1982, 1984, 1985) and the US Open (1983, 1984) whereas three of Evert's four wins were at the French Open (1975, 1985, 1986) and the fourth was the Australian Open (1982). In their eight semifinal clashes, their record stands at four wins apiece. Evert defeated Navratilova in the semifinals of the US Open (1975), Wimbledon (1976 and 1980), and the Australian Open (1988) but lost to Navratilova in the semifinals of the US Open (1981), Wimbledon (1987 and 1988), and the French Open (1987). Interestingly, in those semifinal rounds, each player won twice on grass, once on hard, and once on clay.

Evert played a reduced schedule in 1989 and retired from the professional tour after the US Open. Upon her retirement, she had amassed 18 Grand Slam singles titles (at the time, an Open Era record, male or female), won 157 singles titles (at the time, the record for male or female) and 32 doubles titles. In her 303 tournaments played, Evert reached 229 finals with a win–loss record of 157–72 (68.6%) and 273 semifinals with a win–loss record of (90.1%). Her losses before the semifinal: first round (7); second round – two of which were defaults (6); third round – two of which were defaults (6); and quarterfinal losses (11). Evert won the WTA Tour Championships four times and helped the United States win the Fed Cup eight times. Evert's last match was a 6–3, 6–2 win over Conchita Martínez in the final of the 1989 Fed Cup.

Rivalries

During her career versus selected rivals, Evert was: 40–6 against Virginia Wade, 37–43 against Martina Navratilova, 26–13 against Evonne Goolagong Cawley, 24–0 against Virginia Ruzici, 23–1 against Sue Barker, 22–0 against Betty Stöve, 22–1 against Rosemary Casals, 21–7 against Hana Mandlíková, 20–1 against Wendy Turnbull, 19–7 against Billie Jean King (winning the last 11 matches with a loss of only two sets), 19–3 against Pam Shriver, 18–2 against Kerry Melville Reid, 17–2 against Manuela Maleeva-Fragniere, 17–2 against Helena Suková, 17–3 against Andrea Jaeger, 16–3 against Dianne Fromholtz Balestrat, 15–0 against Olga Morozova, 13–0 against Françoise Dürr, 9–4 against Margaret Court, 9–8 against Tracy Austin, 7–0 against Mary Joe Fernandez, 6–3 against Gabriela Sabatini, 6–5 against Nancy Richey Gunter (winning the last six matches), 6–8 against Steffi Graf (losing the last eight matches) and 2–1 against Monica Seles.

Awards and recognitions
Evert was voted the Associated Press Female Athlete of the Year on four occasions and was the first female athlete to be Sports Illustrated magazine's sole recipient of "Sportswoman of the Year" award in 1976. In April 1985, she was voted the "Greatest Woman Athlete of the Last 25 Years" by the Women's Sports Foundation. Evert served as president of the Women's Tennis Association during 1975–76, and from 1983 to 1991.

In 1995, she was the fourth player ever to be unanimously elected into the International Tennis Hall of Fame following a worldwide ballot of 185 sports journalists. In 1997, the International Tennis Federation (ITF) presented her with its highest accolade - the Philippe Chatrier Award - for her contributions to tennis, whilst 1999 saw Evert rated No. 50 among ESPN's Greatest North American athletes of the 20th century. Evert was awarded the International Club’s prestigious Jean Borotra Sportsmanship Award in 2001. In 2005, Tennis named her fourth on its list of 40 Greatest Players of the Tennis era.

In 2012, Tennis Channel conducted a poll of players and experts to determine the 100 Greatest Players of all-time, in which Evert ranked ninth overall, and fourth highest among women (finishing behind Graf, Navratilova, and Court in that order.) In June 2013, Evert was awarded a special merit from the International Tennis Hall of Fame. They presented her their gold ring in recognition of her outstanding achievements both on and off the tennis court.

Playing style
Evert was a baseline player, who is credited with revolutionising the sport of tennis. She was known for her consistent, counterpunching game, with her being described retrospectively by the International Tennis Hall of Fame as a "human backboard". Evert was one of the first players to play exclusively from the baseline, typically approaching the net to retrieve short balls only; towards the end of her career, however, Evert would approach the net to end points more frequently. Evert's forehand was hit flat, with consistent depth and power, penetrating deep into the court; towards the end of her career with the development of graphite technology, she would begin to apply more topspin to her forehand. Evert was one of the first women who successfully used a double-handed backhand on the WTA tour, which did not have the extra reach that a one-handed backhand afforded, but did provide power and consistency that was previously unseen on the tour, and would later become the norm for female tennis players. Evert would not typically hit large numbers of winners, instead predicating her game on the retrieval of balls with devastating accuracy, and keeping unforced errors to a minimum. Evert did not possess a powerful serve, however, it was reliable and accurate.  Evert possessed delicate touch, and had one of the most effective drop shots at the time. Playing in an era where serve and volleying was the dominant style of play, Evert was able to hit difficult passing shots with ease, pushing her opponents behind the baseline, and preventing them from rushing the net. Evert's greatest strengths on court were her speed, detailed footwork, court coverage, fitness, consistency, and mental fortitude. Despite having success on all surfaces, Evert's favourite surface was clay, where the high bounce and slower speed afforded by the surface allowed her to execute her measured, defensive style of play with tremendous success; this is highlighted by her career 382–22 (94.6%) winning record on the surface. Due to her composure, mental toughness, and elegant style of play, Evert was known as the "Ice Princess".

Personal life
Evert was born in 1954 in Fort Lauderdale, Florida, to Colette ( Thompson) and Jimmy Evert, and raised in a committed Catholic household. She is a 1973 graduate of St. Thomas Aquinas High School in Ft. Lauderdale.

Her father was a professional tennis coach, and tennis was a way of life in his family. Chris and her sister Jeanne became professional tennis players; their brother John played tennis on scholarship at the University of Alabama and later at Vanderbilt University, and brother Drew had a tennis scholarship to Auburn University. Youngest sister Clare played scholarship tennis at Southern Methodist University. Chris, John, and sisters Jeanne and Clare, all won titles at the prestigious Junior Orange Bowl in Florida.

Before she won her first Grand Slam event, Evert signed a contract with Puritan Fashions to endorse a line of sportswear. Company president Carl Rosen thought so highly of her that he named a yearling racehorse in her honor. The horse, "Chris Evert", went on to win the 1974 U.S. Filly Triple Crown, be voted the Eclipse Award for Outstanding 3-Year-Old Filly, and was inducted into the National Museum of Racing and Hall of Fame.

In the 1970s, Evert's romance with the top men's player Jimmy Connors captured the public's imagination, particularly after they both won the 1974 singles titles at Wimbledon. Evert and Connors also occasionally played mixed doubles together. They became engaged when she was 19 and a wedding was planned for November 8, 1974. The romance did not last, and the wedding was called off. In May 2013, Connors wrote in his autobiography that Evert was pregnant with their child and she unilaterally decided to terminate the pregnancy. Evert replied that she was "extremely disappointed that he [Connors] used the book to misrepresent a private matter".

While playing a match at the 1978 U.S. Open, Evert was wearing a diamond line bracelet, which fell from her wrist to the surface of the court. She said about this, "I dropped my tennis bracelet", and since then diamond line bracelets have also been called "tennis bracelets". 

In 1979, Evert married British tennis player John Lloyd and changed her name to Chris Evert Lloyd. After her affair with British singer and actor Adam Faith, the couple separated, but reconciled and chronicled their marriage in a biography Lloyd On Lloyd co-authored by Carol Thatcher. The couple divorced in April 1987.

In 1988, Evert married downhill skier Andy Mill, who had been introduced to her by Martina Navratilova. They have three sons: Alexander (b. 1991), Nicholas (b. 1994) and Colton (b. 1996). On November 13, 2006, Evert filed for divorce. The divorce was finalized on December 4, 2006, with Evert paying Mill a settlement of U.S. $7 million in cash and securities.

On June 28, 2008, Evert married her third husband, Australian golfer Greg Norman in the Bahamas. On October 2, 2009, they announced they were separating after 15 months. Their divorce became final on December 8, 2009.

In 2021, Evert became a supporter of the new Women's Sports Policy Working Group, formed in response to President Joe Biden's executive order that mandates blanket inclusion for all transgender female athletes.

Evert's sister, Jeanne, died of ovarian cancer following a two-year illness. Chris Evert underwent a preventative hysterectomy after learning she carried the BRCA gene mutation. Cancer was uncovered in her resected Fallopian tubes in 2022. In May 2022, it was reported that Evert had completed chemotherapy treatment for her ovarian cancer. She stated her doctor told her there was a 90% chance the cancer would never return due to it being diagnosed early.

Current work
Evert owns the Evert Tennis Academy with her brother John in Boca Raton, Florida and helps coach the Saint Andrew's School's high school tennis team. She contributes to Tennis magazine, of which she is also publisher. In June 2011, she joined ESPN as a tennis commentator for Grand Slam tournaments. In 2015, she launched a line of tennis and active apparel in collaboration with Tail Activewear called Chrissie by Tail. She was also a member of the Athlete Advisory Committee for the 2019 Aurora Games.

Career statistics

Grand Slam singles performance timeline

Records
 These records were attained in Open Era of tennis.
 Records in bold indicate peerless achievements.
 As Evert elected not to participate in a number of Grand Slam tournaments, the term "consecutive" is inexact. In 19 seasons of professional tennis, Evert competed in all four Grand Slam tournaments in the same year only six times.

See also

 WTA Tour records
 List of WTA number 1 ranked singles tennis players
 List of female tennis players
 List of tennis rivalries
 Tennis records of the Open Era – Women's singles
 Open Era tennis records – women's singles
 Luxembourgian American
 Performance timelines for all female tennis players who reached at least one Grand Slam final
 Jim Everett

Notes

References

Further reading

External links

 
 
 
 
 Chris Evert interviewed by KHOU in 1971 from Texas Archive of the Moving Image

 
1954 births
21st-century American women
Living people
American female tennis players
American people of Luxembourgian descent
Catholics from Florida
Australian Open (tennis) champions
French Open champions
Sportspeople from Boca Raton, Florida
People from Rancho Mirage, California
Sportspeople from Fort Lauderdale, Florida
Tennis commentators
International Tennis Hall of Fame inductees
Tennis people from Florida
Tennis players at the 1988 Summer Olympics
US Open (tennis) champions
Wimbledon champions
Grand Slam (tennis) champions in women's singles
Grand Slam (tennis) champions in women's doubles
Sports world record holders
Women sports announcers
Catholics from California
Olympic tennis players of the United States
St. Thomas Aquinas High School (Florida) alumni
WTA number 1 ranked singles tennis players
ITF World Champions